The name Odessa has been used for one tropical cyclone in the eastern Pacific Ocean and three in the western Pacific Ocean.
 Eastern Pacific
 Hurricane Odessa (1964)
 Northwest Pacific
 Typhoon Odessa (1982) (T8203, 03W)
 Typhoon Odessa (1985) (T8512, 13W)
 Typhoon Odessa (1988) (T8825, 25W, Seniang)

Pacific typhoon set index articles
Pacific hurricane set index articles